The Value Inquiry Book Series (VIBS) is an international scholarly program, that publishes philosophical books in all areas of value inquiry, including social and political thought, ethics, applied philosophy, aesthetics, feminism, pragmatism, personalism, religious values, medical and health values, values in education, values in science and technology, humanistic  psychology, cognitive science, formal axiology, history of philosophy, post-communist thought, peace theory, law and society, and theory of culture.

The book series was founded in 1992 by Robert Ginsberg and is published by Rodopi.

ISSN

Executive Editor
Leonidas Donskis, Member of the European Parliament, and previously Professor and Dean of Vytautas Magnus University School of Political Science and Diplomacy, Kaunas, Lithuania

Associate Editors 

 
G. John M. Abbarno
George Allan
Gerhold K. Becker
Raymond Angelo Belliotti
Kenneth A. Bryson
C. Stephen Byrum
Harvey Cormier
Robert Delfino
Rem B. Edwards
Malcolm D. Evans
Roland Faber
Daniel B. Gallagher
Andrew Fitz-Gibbon

Francesc Forn I Argimon
William C. Gay
Dane R. Gordon
J. Everet Green
Heta Aleksandra Gylling
Matti Häyry
Brian G. Henning
Steven V. Hicks
Richard T. Hull
Michael Krausz
Mark Letteri
Olli Loukola
Vincent L. Luizzi

Hugh P. McDonald
Adrianne McEvoy
Danielle Poe
Peter A. Redpath
Arleen L.F. Salles
Mikhail Sergeev
John R. Shook
Eddy Souffrant
Tuija Takala
 Stella Villarmea
Emil Višňovský
Anne Waters
James R. Watson
John R. Welch

Volumes
recently Published volumes include:
 #275. Practicing Pragmatist Aesthetics: Critical Perspectives on the Arts. Edited by Wojciech Małecki.   E-
 #274. Jewish Thought, Utopia, and Revolution. Edited by Elena Namli, Jayne Svenungsson and Alana M. Vincent.  E-
 #273 Environmental Philosophy: A Revaluation of Cosmopolitan Ethics from an Ecocentric Standpoint. By Hugh P. McDonald.  E-
 #272 Being in America: Sixty Years of the Metaphysical Society. Edited by Brian G. Henning and David Kovacs.  E-
 #271 The Ancients and Shakespeare on Time: Some Remarks on the War of Generations. By Piotr Nowak.  E-
 #270 Reality and Culture: Essays on the Philosophy of Bernard Harrison. Edited by Patricia Hanna.  	E-
 #269 Kierkegaard's Indirect Politics: Interludes with Lukács, Schmitt, Benjamin and Adorno. By Bartholomew Ryan.  E-
 #268 Peace Philosophy and Public Life: Commitments, Crises, and Concepts for Engaged Thinking. Edited by Greg Moses and Gail Presbey.  E-
 #267 Narrative Ethics: Edited by Jakob Lothe and Jeremy Hawthorn.  	E-
 #265  Amor Dei in the Sixteenth and Seventeenth Centuries. By David C. Bellusci.  	E-
 #264 Beyond Aesthetics and Politics: Philosophical and Axiological Studies on the Avant-Garde, Pragmatism, and Postmodernism. By Krzysztof Piotr Skowroński.  	E-
 #263. Trust: Analytic and Applied Perspectives. Edited by Pekka Mäkelä and Cynthia Townley.  E-
 #262.  Discussing Modernity: A Dialogue with Martin Jay. Edited by Dorota Koczanowicz, Leszek Koczanowicz, and David Schauffler.  E-
 #261. The End of Prisons: Reflections from the Decarceration Movement. Edited by Mechthild E. Nagel and Anthony J. Nocella II.  E- Textbook-
 #260. The Conspiracy of the Prince of Macchia & G. B. Vico. By Giorgio A. Pinton. Introduction by Paolo Fabiani.  E-
 #259. Jesus or Nietzsche: How Should We Live Our Lives? By Raymond Angelo Belliotti. HB  E-
 #258. Oneness and the Displacement of Self: Dialogues on Self-Realization. By Michael Krausz.  E-
 #257. Polyphonic Thinking and the Divine. Edited by Jim Kanaris.  E-
 #256. Shakespeare and Philosophy. Lust, Love, and Law. By Raymond Angelo Belliotti.  E-
 #255. Queer Philosophy. Presentations of the Society for Lesbian and Gay Philosophy, 1998-2008. Edited by Raja Halwani, Carol V. A. Quinn, and Andy Wible.  E-
 #254. Giordano Bruno. An Introduction. By Paul Richard Blum.  E-
 #253. The Revolt of Unreason. Miguel de Unamuno and Antonio Caso on the Crisis of Modernity. By Michael Candelaria.  E- 
 #252. Yet Another Europe after 1984. Rethinking Milan Kundera and the Idea of Central Europe. Edited by Leonidas Donskis.  E-
 #251. Rethinking Plato. A Cartesian Quest for the Real Plato. By Necip Fikri Alican.  E-
 #250. Karl Jaspers. From Selfhood to Being. By Ronny Miron.  E-
 #249. Love as a Guide to Morals. By Andrew Fitz-Gibbon.  E-
 #248. Wittgenstein on the Human Spirit. By Yuval Lurie.  ISBN 978-90-420- 3517-1 E-
 #247. SS Thinking and the Holocaust. By André Mineau.  E-
 #246. Personality Disorders and States of Aloneness. Intimacy and Aloneness. A Multi-Volume Study in Philosophical Psychology. Volume Two. By John G. McGraw.  E-
 #245. Justice for Older People. Edited by Harry Lesser.  E-
 #244. Shusterman’s Pragmatism. Between Literature and Somaesthetics. Edited by Dorota Koczanowicz and Wojciech Małecki.  E-
 #243. Speculative Evaluations. Essays on a Pluralistic Universe. By Hugh P. McDonald.  E-
 #242. Politics Otherwise. Shakespeare as Social and Political Critique. Edited by Leonidas Donskis and J. D. Mininger.  E-
 #241. Responses to the Enlightenment. An Exchange on Foundations, Faith, and Community. By William Sweet and Hendrik Hart.  E-
 #240. Identity and Social Transformation. Central European Pragmatist Forum, Volume Five.  E-
 #239. Friendship. A Central Moral Value. By Michael H. Mitias.  E-
 #238. The Search for a Theory of Cognition. Early Mechanisms and New Ideas. Edited by Stefano Franchi and Francesco Bianchini.  E-
 #237. The Memory of Pain. Women’s Testimonies of the Holocaust. By Camila Loew.  E-
 #236. Tradition in Social Science. By Maurice Hauriou. Translation from French with an Introduction by Christopher Berry Gray.  E-
 #235. Reconstructing Subjects. A Philosophical Critique of Psychotherapy. By Hakam H. Al-Shawi.  E-
 #234. Social Justice, Poverty and Race. Normative and Empirical Points of View. Edited by Paul Kriese and Randall E. Osborne.  E-
 #233. The Privacy of the Psychical. By Amihud Gilead.  E-
 #232. Sex, Love, and Friendship. Studies of the Society for the Philosophy of Sex and Love: 1993-2003. Edited by Adrianne Leigh McEvoy.  E-
 #231. Reburial of Nonexistents. Reconsidering the Meinong-Russell Debate. By Carolyn Swanson.  E-
 #230. The Philosophy of Viagra. Bioethical Responses to the Viagrification of the Modern World., Edited by Thorsten Botz-Bornstein. 
 #229. Communities of Peace. Confronting Injustice and Creating Justice., Edited by Danielle Poe. 
 #228. New Perspectives on Pragmatism and Analytic Philosophy., Edited by Rosa M. Calcaterra. 
 #227. Postethnophilosophy, by Sanya Osha. 
 #226. Niccolò Machiavelli. History, Power, and Virtue., Edited by Leonidas Donskis. 
 #225. Remembrance and Reconciliation., Edited by Rob Gildert and Dennis Rothermel. 
 #224. Creative Actualization. A Meliorist Theory of Values., Hugh P. McDonald. 
 #223. The Continuing Relevance of John Dewey. Reflections on Aesthetics, Morality, Science, and Society., Edited by Larry A. Hickman, Matthew Caleb Flamm, Krzysztof Piotr Skowroński and Jennifer A. Rea. 
 #222. “Truth” is a Divine Name. Hitherto Unpublished Papers of Edward A. Synan, 1918-1997., Introduction and Edition by Janice L. Schultz-Aldrich. 
 #221. Intimacy and Isolation., by John G. McGraw. 
 #220. Beyond Metaphysics? Explorations in Alfred North Whitehead’s Late Thought., Edited by Roland Faber, Brian G. Henning, and Clinton Combs. 
 #219. Containing (Un)American Bodies. Race, Sexuality, and Post-9/11 Constructions of Citizenship., by Mary K. Bloodsworth-Lugo and Carmen R. Lugo-Lugo.

External links
 Value Inquiry Book Series page on the publishers website

Philosophy books
Publications established in 1992
Rodopi (publisher) books